Yuna is a third studio album by Malaysian singer-songwriter Yuna. It is her first international album to be released in the United States. The album employs the production of Pharrell Williams and Andre Harris. It also draws from genres like pop rock, adult alternative and indie rock. It mainly received positive responses after its release. It charted at number 19 on the Heatseekers Albums chart.

Track listing

Charts

References

2012 albums
Yuna (singer) albums
Fader Label albums
Albums produced by Pharrell Williams